was created by A-1 Pictures and aired from October 4, 2014 to March 28, 2015. From episodes 1-12, the first opening theme is "Kimi no Matsu Sekai" by Lagoon while the ending theme is "White of Crime" by Revalcy. From episodes 13-24, the second opening theme is "Ai no Scenario" by CHiCO with HoneyWorks, while the ending theme is "Koi no Jumyō" by Galileo Galilei.

Episode list

References

Magic Kaito 1412